The Minor Basilica of Saint Michael the Archangel (Tagalog: Basílika Menor ni San Miguel Arkanghel; Spanish: Basílica Menor de San Miguel Arcángel) commonly known as the Tayabas Basilica, is a Roman Catholic basilica located in Tayabas, Quezon, Philippines under the Diocese of Lucena. Its titular is Saint Michael the Archangel, whose feast is celebrated every September 29.

The basilica is the largest in the province of Quezon; built in the shape of a key, it has the local moniker “Susì ng Tayabas” ("Key of Tayabas"). The church's  aisle is also one of the longest naves among the country’s Spanish colonial era churches.

History
Catholic presence of Tayabas was established in 1578 by Franciscan priests Fray Juán Portocarrero de Plasencia and Fray Diego de Oropesa de San José, known as the “Apostles of Laguna and Tayabas”. In 1580, the town of Tayabas was established as a parish with Michael the Archangel as its patron saint. Like most churches in the Philippines during the Spanish colonial era, the first church was a camarin-type structure of bamboo, nipa and anahaw built between 1580 and 1585 under the Franciscan friars.

The church was repaired under the supervision of Saint Pedro Bautista in 1590. In the same year, the Catholic Church obtained permission from the Superior Government to build the church using stone. Upon the order of Saint Pedro Bautista, leader of the Franciscans, the church was rebuilt in 1600 using bricks; this building was later destroyed by earthquake in 1743 earthquake, leaving only the walls standing. Due to the growing number of Catholics in Tayabas, the church was again rebuilt and extended. It was further expanded under the term of Father Benito de la Pila between 1856 and 1866 with the addition of the transept in the shape of a rotunda and cupola. The brick tile roof was replaced with galvanized iron sheets in 1894.

Father Manuel Gonzáles bought the administration building (casa administración) used by the provincial head of the Franciscans for 962 pesos in 1855. He donated it to the town to be used as classrooms to replace the old, ruined rooms. Gonzáles ordered the school's construction in 1878, using stone, lime and tiled roofing. Together with Father Samuel Mena, Gonzáles restored the old Tribunal built by Governor La O, which had been unused since it had burnt down in 1877. From 1896 to 1899, Father Isabelo Martínez was the first native Filipino priest assigned to Tayabas Basilica, followed by Father Amando Alandy, a native of the town, from 1899 to 1900.

The church's patio played a significant role during the struggle of the Filipino revolutionaries against Spain. General Vicente Lukban and his troops surrendered to the Spanish army on the patio on August 13, 1898, while the Philippine flag was waved from the church's belfry. During the Second World War, the church's convento was used as a garrison by the occupying Japanese Imperial Army.

The church was rededicated on March 14, 1987, by Rubén T. Profugo, DD, Bishop of Lucena. On October 18, 1988, the church was raised to the rank of Minor Basilica by Pope John Paul II through the Congregation for Divine Worship and the Discipline of the Sacraments, and was proclaimed during Mass on January 21, 1989.

Tayabas Basilica is considered to be one of the most beautiful churches in the Philippines. Through Presidential Decree No. 374, the National Museum of the Philippines declared Tayabas Basilica as a National Cultural Treasure on July 31, 2001, along with 25 other churches nationwide.

Features 
The church at Tayabas is generally considered to be Baroque architecture. It is included in a list of more than 30 churches declared National Cultural Treasures by the National Museum of the Philippines.

Patio and facade 
The influence of Chinese architecture in Tayabas is pronounced in the design of the basilica. Stone lions in front of the building show a link to the presence of Chinese traders before the Spanish colonial era. Cherubs in stone relief playing the lute, trombone, drum and trumpet can be seen. Its unusual, three-storey façade is almost eclectic, and was added during renovations to the church. The levels are separated by horizontal bands and images of angels and saints including Saint Francis of Assisi, Saint Dominic and Saint Diego of Alcalá. The bottom level of the façade is marked by the main doors flanked by two niches in Mudejar style, as well as the stone lions. The second level has the side and central windows of the choir loft, with shutters made of capiz shells. The topmost tier has stones statues of the Biblical archangels Michael, Gabriel and Raphael.

Floor plan 
Tayabas Basilica has a unique floor plan that resembles a key. Because of this, the Basilica is often referred to by locals as “Susì ng Tayabas” ("Key of Tayabas")

Aisle  

The church's  aisle is the longest of any church built during the Spanish colonial era. It was built between 1855 and 1860.

Interior 
The basilica interior is built in the Neo-Classical style, with seven altars. An image of the Nuestra Señora de los Ángeles ("Our Lady of Angels") is enshrined in the central retablo of the main altar. Severo Carpintero, known as the Maestro Carpintero ("Master Carpenter") built the church's round transept and crossing. The dome was built together with a third storey and semicircular pediment. It also has an antique organ located in the choir loft and a balcony over the altar. The basilica's ceiling painting was restored in the 1990s by Delfín Antiola.

Church clock 

The basilica's 18th century clock was erected in early 1900 on the belfry; it is one of the oldest and largest church clocks in Asia. The clock chimes once on the hour and half-hour. It was refurbished in 1971 during the term of Monsignor Gregorio Salvatus.

Ermita 

Tayabas Basilica has two ermita chapels dedicated to Nuestra Señora de las Angustias and to San Diego de Alcala.

Cemetery 
The church has an old cemetery made of stone. A chapel with two towers was built in 1889 by Father Samuel Mena. The cemetery was closed when the barrio of Cota (now Lucena) became a town.

Restorations
In 2000, the church underwent major renovations and restorations for the sixth time. The altar was moved from the northern apse to the crossing of the apse below the dome. The church's pulpit and the basilica's monastery were also restored. Fund-raising activities to pay for the restoration of the basilica in preparation for the church's 25th anniversary as a Minor Basilica in 2014 were done since June 2009.

In 2011 the lighting of the facade was converted to solar energy using photovoltaic power panels and other devices. It is the first old church in the Philippines to use solar energy in its facade.

Administration 
Tayabas Basilica is in the jurisdiction of the Vicariate of St. James of the Diocese of Lucena. Reverend Monsignor Dennis Imperial, PC serves as parish priest with Father Roy Macatangay and Father Reymart Karl P. Estrada as parochial vicars.

Festivities 
Tayabas town is also known for its religious activities, the most important of which is the feast of Saint Michael the Archangel, the town's patron saint who is celebrated annually on September 29. The town also celebrates the Viernes Dolores de Turumba in honor of the Our Lady of Sorrows of Turumba, who is celebrated with dance, chanting and a procession. On Holy Week, a stage play depicting the passion and death of Jesus Christ can be viewed on the church patio. The play including the procession of poon – wooden statues.

In popular media 
 The music video of Donna Cruz's Jubilee Song was filmed in the interior of the basilica.

Notes

Bibliography

External links 

 Official Website of the Minor Basilica of Saint Michael the Archangel

Roman Catholic churches in Quezon
Buildings and structures in Tayabas
Baroque architecture in the Philippines
National Cultural Treasures of the Philippines
Basilica churches in the Philippines
Marked Historical Structures of the Philippines
Spanish Colonial architecture in the Philippines
Churches in the Roman Catholic Diocese of Lucena